is a Japanese beach volleyball player, and former volleyball player.

She competed at the 1996 Summer Olympics in volleyball.
She competed at the 2000 Summer Olympics, and the 2008 Summer Olympics in beach volleyball.

External links
 
 
 

1972 births
Living people
Japanese women's volleyball players
Japanese beach volleyball players
Women's beach volleyball players
Olympic volleyball players of Japan
Olympic beach volleyball players of Japan
Asian Games medalists in beach volleyball
Asian Games silver medalists for Japan
Medalists at the 1998 Asian Games
Volleyball players at the 1996 Summer Olympics
Beach volleyball players at the 1998 Asian Games
Beach volleyball players at the 2000 Summer Olympics
Beach volleyball players at the 2008 Summer Olympics
People from Matsuyama, Ehime